Saadatabad (also Romanized as Sa‘ādatābād) is a village in Bidak Rural District, in the Central District of Abadeh County, Fars Province, Iran. At the 2006 census, its population was 19, in 6 families.

References 

Populated places in Abadeh County